The Derzky or Bespokoiny-class destroyers was a class of destroyers built for the Imperial Russian Navy just before World War I. Nine ships were built for the Black Sea Fleet. These ships were popular with the Russians and effective particularly in the Black Sea, where the Ottoman Navy had no similar ships.

Ships

Bibliography

External links

Destroyer classes
D
Wrangel's fleet
Destroyers of the Soviet Navy